Requena-Utiel is a comarca currently in the province of Valencia, Valencian Community, Spain. The area was transferred to this province in 1851, as a result of a reform of the 1833 territorial division of Spain; before that it was a part of the Crown of Castile and of the former province of Cuenca. The inhabitants of the comarca have traditionally been monolingual in Spanish, i.e. they're not Valencian speakers.

Chera, now officially included in Requena-Utiel according to the current administrative division pattern of the Valencian Community, was geographically and historically part of the Serrans comarca.

Municipalities 

Camporrobles
Caudete de las Fuentes
Chera
Fuenterrobles
Requena
Sinarcas
Utiel
Venta del Moro
Villargordo del Cabriel

Transport
The comarca is served by Requena-Utiel railway station on the AVE high-speed rail line from Madrid to Valencia. The C-3 line of the Cercanías Valencia commuter rail network makes stops in Requena, San Antonio de Requena and Utiel.

See also
Manchuela
Serrans

References

External links
Institut Valencià d'Estadística

 
Comarques of the Valencian Community
Geography of the Province of Valencia